The South West Coast Path Association (SWCPA) is a United Kingdom charitable incorporated organisation (before 2015 a registered charity) which exists to promote the interests of users of the South West Coast Path, the longest National Trail in Britain at 630 miles (1014 km).

The Objects of the SWCPA as set out in its constitution are:

  
The SWCPA was founded in 1973 as the South West Way Association and renamed in 1999 when the path itself was renamed. In September 2015 it changed its status to become a Charitable incorporated organisation.  it had  6,679 personal members, who receive twice-yearly newsletters and an annual guide to the path (available for sale to non-members), and 503 business members.

Over the years the SWCPA has worked with local authorities and the National Trust to improve the alignment and condition of the path.  It contributed funds towards the sculptures erected at Minehead and Poole to mark the ends of the path, and a half-way marker.

Publications
  (new edition published in January every year; free to members)
  (describes route from Poole to Minehead; available from the Association)

See also
 South West Coast Path

References

External links
 
 While registered as a charity, from 1974 onwards
 After registration as a Charitable incorporated organisation on 4 September 2015

Hiking organizations
Charities based in Devon